Epsom Provincial Park is a provincial park in British Columbia, Canada, located west of Ashcroft around Oregon Jack Hill.

References

See also
Oregon Jack Provincial Park

Provincial parks of British Columbia
Thompson Country
Year of establishment missing